Paredes may refer to:

Places

Angola
 Paredes, Angola, a town and commune in the province of Bengo

Portugal
 Paredes, Portugal, a municipality in the district of Porto
 Paredes (parish), a parish in the municipality of Paredes

Spain
Paredes, Spain, a municipality in the province of Cuenca, in the  autonomous community of Castile-La Mancha
Paredes de Escalona, a municipality in the province of Toledo, in the  autonomous community of Castile-La Mancha
Paredes de Nava, a municipality in the province of Palencia, in the  autonomous community of Castile and León
Paredes de Sigüenza, a municipality in the province of Guadalajara, in the  autonomous community of Castile-La Mancha
Murias de Paredes, a municipality in the province of León, in the  autonomous community of Castile and León

Other uses
 Paredes (surname)